Copp's Hill Terrace is a historic terrace and park between Commercial and Charter Streets west of Jackson Avenue on Copp's Hill in the North End of Boston, Massachusetts near Copp's Hill Burying Ground.

A landscaped arrangement of granite steps, knee-walls and banisters with cast-iron parapets ascending to a large plaza overlooking Commercial Street and the mouth of the Mystic River, the terrace was designed in the 1890s by landscape architect Charles Eliot of Olmsted, Olmsted and Eliot, and built by Boston contractor Perkins & White. From the terrace, a large crowd observed the destruction wrought by Boston's Great Molasses Flood of 1919.

Copp's Hill Terrace was added to the National Register of Historic Places in 1990.

African-American History 
A small community of free African Americans lived on the steep slope of Copp's Hill from the 17th to the 19th century. Members of this community were buried in the Copp's Hill Burying Ground, where a few remaining headstones can still be seen today, including that of Prince Hall, the founder of Prince Hall Freemasonry.

Images

See also
National Register of Historic Places listings in northern Boston, Massachusetts

References

1893 establishments in Massachusetts
National Register of Historic Places in Boston
Geography of Boston
Parks in Massachusetts
North End, Boston